Élber de Souza (born 23 July 1972), commonly known as Giovane Élber, is a Brazilian former professional footballer who played as a striker.

A prolific goalscorer in various clubs, Élber's career was mostly spent in Germany, where he represented most notably Bayern Munich (six full seasons), scoring a total of 133 league goals in 260 matches for three clubs.

Club career
Born in Londrina, Paraná, Élber is a youth product of Londrina.

Milan
At the age of 18 he signed for A.C. Milan in 1990, Élber went almost unnoticed during his one-year spell with the Serie A side.

Grasshoppers
Subsequently, he moved to Switzerland Grasshopper Club Zürich, initially on loan. He immediately started showing displays of offensive talent at his new club, namely in a 1992–93 UEFA Cup tie against Sporting Clube de Portugal where, after a 1–2 home loss, he was influential in the club's 4–3 aggregate win, scoring twice.

VfB Stuttgart
After more than 50 official goals for Grasshoppers, Élber signed with VfB Stuttgart of Germany in the 1994 summer. He scored in his Bundesliga debut, a 2–1 home win against Hamburger SV, and finished his debut season with eight goals, which would be the only campaign he netted in single digits for the following seven years.

In the 1996–97 season, Élber netted 20 official goals for Stuttgart, 17 in the league, and three in the cup, including both against FC Energie Cottbus in the final (2–0 win). At Stuttgart he formed the so-called magic triangle (German: Magisches Dreieck) with Krassimir Balakov and Fredi Bobic.

Bayern Munich
The following summer, he moved to fellow league team Bayern Munich where, save for one year, he was always crowned the club's top scorer (Carsten Jancker prevented that honour); additionally, he was instrumental in the conquest of four leagues, the 2000–01 UEFA Champions League, scoring in both legs in the semi-finals against Real Madrid, and the 2001 Intercontinental Cup, whilst winning the Torjägerkanone award for 2002–03 with 21 goals; the Bavarians won the double.

Lyon
31-year-old Élber then spent the vast majority of the 2003–04 campaign (played four matches with Bayern) in France with Olympique Lyonnais, replacing compatriot Sonny Anderson who had left for Spain. In the 2003–04 UEFA Champions League, he scored against his former club Bayern Munich to win 2–1 in Germany. Later on, he scored in a 2–2 draw against Porto in the quarter-finals; however, Lyon were eliminated from the competition after losing 4–2 on aggregate.

Eventually, he helped the club to the third of its seven consecutive Ligue 1 accolades, but then suffered a severe fibula and tibia injury which put him out of action for more than one year.

Borussia Mönchengladbach

He made his comeback to professional football in Germany with Borussia Mönchengladbach, whom he joined in January 2005.

Cruzeiro
In January 2006, after nearly 15 years of absence, Élber returned to his country, finishing his career at Cruzeiro. After an emotional announcement, he retired from the club three months before the end of the season on 9 September, after injuries and the loss of his father.

International career
Due to stiff competition, Élber could not translate his club form to the Brazilian national team. In his first year of international play, 1998, he scored six goals in as many games, but would only collect nine more caps in the following three years.

In the 1991 FIFA World Youth Championship, Élber scored four in six matches as the under-20s lost to hosts Portugal, on penalties.

After retirement from active play

After announcing his retirement he then returned to Bayern, where he began working for the club as a scout, searching in his country for young talents.

Élber works as a pundit for German television station Das Erste. He provided expert analysis during the 2013 FIFA Confederations Cup and reappeared in this capacity during the 2014 FIFA World Cup.

Personal life
He is mostly referred to as Giovane Élber (sometimes also mistakenly as Giovanni Élber), which is a German variation of his Italian nickname il giovane Élber ("the young Élber").

Career statistics

Club

International

Scores and results list Brazil's goal tally first, score column indicates score after each Élber goal.

Honours
Grasshoppers
 Swiss Cup: 1993–94

Stuttgart
 DFB-Pokal: 1996–97

Bayern Munich
 Bundesliga: 1998–99, 1999–2000, 2000–01, 2002–03
 DFB-Pokal: 1997–98, 1999–2000, 2002–03
 DFB-Ligapokal: 1997, 1998, 1999, 2000
 UEFA Champions League: 2000–01
 Intercontinental Cup: 2001

Lyon
 Ligue 1: 2003–04
 Trophée des Champions: 2004

Cruzeiro
 Campeonato Mineiro: 2006
Individual
 FIFA World Youth Championship: Silver Ball 1991
 Swiss League: Top scorer 1993–94
 Swiss League: Best foreign player 1993–94
 kicker Bundesliga Team of the Season: 1996–97, 1998–99, 2002–03
 Bundesliga Top scorer: 2002-03 (shared with Thomas Christiansen)
 Goal of the Year (Germany): 1999
 Bayern Munich All-time XI

References

External links

 
 
 

1972 births
Living people
Sportspeople from Londrina
Brazilian footballers
Association football forwards
Brazil international footballers
Brazil under-20 international footballers
1998 CONCACAF Gold Cup players
Londrina Esporte Clube players
Cruzeiro Esporte Clube players
A.C. Milan players
Swiss Super League players
Grasshopper Club Zürich players
Bundesliga players
VfB Stuttgart players
FC Bayern Munich footballers
Borussia Mönchengladbach players
Ligue 1 players
Olympique Lyonnais players
Kicker-Torjägerkanone Award winners
FC Bayern Munich non-playing staff
UEFA Champions League winning players
Brazilian expatriate footballers
Expatriate footballers in Italy
Brazilian expatriate sportspeople in Switzerland
Expatriate footballers in Switzerland
Brazilian expatriate sportspeople in Germany
Expatriate footballers in Germany
Brazilian expatriate sportspeople in France
Expatriate footballers in France